Reid Bryson (7 June 1920 – 11 June 2008) was an American atmospheric scientist, geologist and meteorologist. He was a professor emeritus of the University of Wisconsin–Madison. He completed a B.A. in geology at Denison University in 1941 and a Ph.D. in meteorology from the University of Chicago in 1948. In 1946 he joined the faculty of the University of Wisconsin–Madison, and in 1948 he became the founder and first chairman of the University of Wisconsin-Madison's Department of Meteorology and Center for Climatic Research. He was the first director of the Institute for Environmental Studies (now the Nelson Institute) in 1970.

In 1944, during World War II, he was one of the few meteorologists who accurately identified Typhoon Cobra, which savaged Halsey's Third Fleet.

Bryson was made a Global Laureate by the United Nations Global Environment Program in 1990.

Views

Bryson's main contribution to the debate on climate change was the idea of "the human volcano" causing global cooling, via an increase in aerosol loading. This idea was sparked in 1962 by his own observation, while flying across India en route to a conference, that his view of the ground was  blocked not by clouds but by dust. At the time, the instrumental temperature record did not show unambiguous warming and the view that the earth might be cooling, and heading for further cooling, was not unreasonable. Others, including Hubert Lamb, who created a Dust Veil Index, thought volcanoes were more responsible for global-scale aerosol.

In 1973, Bryson testified to Congress that global warming from fossil-fuel combustion was politically unstoppable. 
There is no way right now that we can control the climate to make it more benign. Even if we were to say "let us stop using fossil fuels so that we do not add carbon dioxide to the atmosphere, because that impacts the world climate," how on earth could you stop using fossil fuels? Even those countries that are most heavily impacted by the climatic change are the ones who say it is our turn to be affluent and it is in the use of fossil fuels that one gains affluence.

In later years, when it was clear that the climate was indeed warming, Bryson argued that while climate change and a global increase in temperature are real, he did not believe that they are caused by human activity. Rather, he argued that they are part of natural global climate cycles, particularly the end of the Little Ice Age:

"All this argument is the temperature going up or not, it’s absurd," Bryson continues. "Of course it’s going up. It has gone up since the early 1800s, before the Industrial Revolution, because we’re coming out of the Little Ice Age, not because we’re putting more carbon dioxide into the air."

Selected publications

Bryson wrote more than 230 articles and five books, including Climates of Hunger, which won the Banta Medal for Literary Achievement.

Books
 R. A. Bryson, Airmasses, Streamlines, and the Boreal Forest 1966: Department of Mines and Technical Surveys, Geography Branch

Selected articles

References

External links
 Center for Climatic Research, University of Wisconsin, About R.A. Bryson`
 Volcanic Eruptions and Aerosol Optical Depth Data, 2002
 Pioneer of climatology dies at 88 at UW-Madison

1920 births
2008 deaths
Denison University alumni
University of Chicago alumni
University of Wisconsin–Madison faculty
American climatologists
American meteorologists